Rodolphoolithus is an oogenus of elongatoolithid egg native to Morocco. It is known only from a single partial egg and several eggshell fragments, but it probably had a highly elongated shape like other Elongatoolithids. They have an eggshell with two layers: a mamillary layer and a continuous layer. The mamillary layer is relatively thick (compared to other Elongatoolithids); it is a half to two thirds the thickness of the continuous layer. The ornamentation of its outer surface is ramotuberculate, i.e. covered with low, irregular ridges. Unfortunately, the pore system cannot be observed due to recrystallization of the fossilized eggshell. Like other Elongatoolithids, Rodolphoolithus was laid by small theropods.

References

Dinosaur reproduction
Fossil parataxa described in 1997
Fossils of Morocco
Elongatoolithids